Domenico Silvio Passionei (2 December 1682 – 5 July 1761) was an Italian Cardinal of the Roman Catholic Church.

Biography
Born in Fossombrone near Urbino, Marche, he went to Rome in 1695, where he studied philosophy at the Collegio Clementino (Ph.D. in 1701) and law at the university La Sapienza. Already in these early years he corresponded with scholars throughout Europe, including Protestants and Jansenists. In 1706, he was sent as legate to Paris, where he stayed for two years. Later he traveled through the Netherlands, where he participated as official representative of the Holy See at the peace conferences of The Hague (1708) and Utrecht (1712). Upon his return to Rome, he was made a prelate. However, when he was denied a nunciature, he temporarily retired from 1717 (after his father's death) to 1721 on his estate in Fossombrone.

Under the new Pope Innocent XIII, he finally was named Nuncio in Lucerne, Switzerland, and also made titulary archbishop of Ephesos. From 1730 to 1738, he was Nuncio in Vienna. In 1738, he was created Cardinal Priest, and three years later, he became pro-librarian of the Vatican Library to Cardinal Angelo Maria Quirini, whom he would succeed as librarian in 1755. He was also a corresponding member of Societas eruditorum incognitorum in terris Austriacis.

Passionei was decidedly anti-Jesuit, opposing the beatification of the Jesuit Cardinal Bellarmine in 1754. Other than that, he was a proponent of a liberal Catholicism and considered a protector of Jansenists, and defended authors like Montesquieu and Helvétius in Index trials.

He was also a manuscript collector, minuscule 847 and minuscule 848 were his manuscripts.

References

Further reading 
  Alfredo Serrai, Domenico Passionei e la sua biblioteca, Milan, Sylvestre Bonnard, 2004,

External links 

Summary

1682 births
1761 deaths
People from the Province of Pesaro and Urbino
18th-century Italian cardinals
Apostolic Nuncios to Switzerland
Apostolic Nuncios to France
Italian librarians